Mirzapur Lok Sabha constituency is one of the 80 Lok Sabha (parliamentary) constituencies in Uttar Pradesh, a state in northern India. This constituency covers the entirety of the Mirzapur district.

Assembly segments
Presently, the Mirzapur Lok Sabha constituency comprises five Vidhan Sabha (legislative assembly) segments. These are:

Members of Parliament

Election results

See also
 Mirzapur district
 List of Constituencies of the Lok Sabha

References

External links
Mirzapur lok sabha  constituency election 2019 result details

Lok Sabha constituencies in Uttar Pradesh
Mirzapur district